Alexandra Gucci Zarini (née Alexandra Gucci, born c. 1985) is a children's rights activist. She is an heiress of the Gucci family, elder daughter of Patricia Gucci, granddaughter of Aldo Gucci, and great-granddaughter of Guccio Gucci.

Biography 
Alexandra is the Founder and Board Chair of the Alexandra Gucci Children’s Foundation, and an advocate for the protection of children around the world.

In September 2020, she filed a lawsuit accusing her stepfather Joseph Ruffalo of sexually assaulting her over a period of 16 years from the age of 6 to the age of 22. She further claimed that her mother, Patricia Gucci, and her grandmother, Bruna Palombo, knew of the abuse and that both women threatened to disinherit her if she was not to remain quiet about it. Ruffalo denied the allegations and said he is innocent. Her mother divorced Ruffalo in 2007 when she got to know that he sexually abused both her daughters Alexandra and Victoria. Alexandra recently claimed that she believes Ruffalo blackmailed her mother Patricia and that her mothers fear of facing the same fate as her grandfather Aldo Gucci (going to prison for tax evasion) may have guided her decision to stay quiet. 

In addition to the civil lawsuit against Patricia Gucci, Joseph Ruffalo and Bruna Palombo, Alexandra filed complaints with the Beverly Hills Police Department and the Riverside County Sheriff's Department in California, and the Thames Valley Police in England. All three of these criminal investigations are still ongoing.

Personal life 
Alexandra changed her surname to Zarini after her marriage. She became a mother in 2016.

References 

Children's rights activists
Gucci people
Living people

1980s births
Year of birth uncertain